FXYD domain-containing ion transport regulator 5 also named dysadherin (human) or RIC (mouse) is a protein that in humans is encoded by the FXYD5 gene.

Function 

This gene encodes a member of a family of small membrane proteins that share a 35-amino acid signature sequence domain, beginning with the sequence PFXYD and containing 7 invariant and 6 highly conserved amino acids. The approved human gene nomenclature for the family is FXYD-domain containing ion transport regulator. Mouse FXYD5 has been termed RIC (Related to Ion Channel). FXYD2, also known as the gamma subunit of the Na,K-ATPase, regulates the properties of that enzyme. FXYD1 (phospholemman), FXYD2 (gamma), FXYD3 (MAT-8), FXYD4 (CHIF), and FXYD5 (RIC) have been shown to induce channel activity in experimental expression systems. Transmembrane topology has been established for two family members (FXYD1 and FXYD2), with the N-terminus extracellular and the C-terminus on the cytoplasmic side of the membrane. This gene product, FXYD5, has not been characterized as a protein. Two transcript variants have been found for this gene, and they are both predicted to encode the same protein.

Dysadherin is the gamma5 subunit of the human Na,K-ATPase. Of all the FXYD members, dysadherin is the only member that has a large extracellular sequence of 140 amino acids. Dysadherin has been observed to be over-expressed on the surface of cells that have down regulated levels of surface E-cadherin. CCL2 (bone homing cytokine)is a protein that is highly affected by silencing dysadherin expression. Dysadherin interferes with cell adhesion via beta1 subunit interactions. Dysdaherin is a target for an extracellular antibody drug conjugate where the antibody to dysadherin is attached to a cardiac glycoside.

Clinical significance 

Dysadherin has been found to be a marker for metastatic cancers and found up-regulated in multiple cancer types.

References

Further reading